Christopher Lim Legaspi (born January 1, 1973), popularly known by his stage name Kier Legaspi, is a Filipino actor known for his villain roles in the 90s. He is the younger brother of fellow actors Zoren Legaspi and Brando Legaspi (whose real name is "Kier Lim Legaspi", a name Christopher borrowed and used on-screen) and is also a son of veteran actor Lito Legaspi. He has one daughter with actress Marjorie Barretto named Daniella (Dani).

Filmography

Television

Film
Boy Golden: Shoot to Kill, the Arturo Porcuna Story (Viva Films, 2013)
Isang Araw Lang (UNTV Films, 2013)
Paraiso (Unitel Pictures, 2005)
Masikip Sa Dibdib: The Boobita Rose Story (Viva Films, 2004) 
Bala Ko, Para Sa'Yo (Regal Films, 2001)
Burador: Ang Babaing Sugo (Manoli Films, 2000)
Kapag Kumulo Ang Dugo (Regal Films, 1999)
Isusumbong Kita Sa Tatay Ko (Star Cinema, 1999)
Di Puwedeng Hindi Puwede (Star Cinema, 1999)
Braulio Tapang (Good Harvest Productions, 1999)
Notoryus (Star Cinema, 1998)
Init Ng Dugo (Leo Films, 1998)
Ipaglaban mo II: The movie (Star Cinema, 1997)
Anak ni Boy Negro (Neo Films, 1997)
Boy Chico: Hulihin Si Ben Tumbling (Viva Films, 1997)
Mariano Mison... NBI (Star Cinema, 1997) 
Paracale Gang (Falcon Films, 1996)
Sa Aking Mga Kamay (Star Cinema, 1996)
Bossing (MMG Entertainment, 1996)
Lablab Sa Paraiso (Diamond Jade Films, 1996)
Mangarap Ka (Star Cinema, 1995)
Hatulan Bilibid Boys 2 (Diamond Jade Films, 1995)
Kahit Harangan Ng Bala (Regal Films, 1995)
Chickboys (OctoArts Films, 1994)
Biboy Banal: Pagganti Ko Tapos Kayo (OctoArts Films, 1994)
Grepor Butch Belgica Story (Viva Films, 1994) 
Si Ayala At Si Zobel (OctoArts Films, 1994)
Andres Manambit: Angkan Ng Matatapang (Viva Films, 1994)
Blue Jeans Gang (Viva Films, 1992)
Miss Na Miss kita (Utol kong hoodlum II) (Viva Films, 1992)
Ang Utol Kong Hoodlum (Viva Films, 1991)
Angelito San Miguel: Ang Batang City Jail (Viva Films, 1991)
Noel Juico: Batang Kriminal (Viva Films, 1991)
Bikining Itim (Viva Films, 1990)
Teacher's Enemy No. 1 (Viva Films, 1990)
Petrang Kabayo 2: Anong Ganda Mo! Mukha Kang Kabayo (Viva Films, 1990)
Tootsie Wootsie: Ang Bandang Walang Atrasan (Viva Films, 1990)
Hulihin Si... Nardong Toothpick (Viva Films, 1990)
Wooly Booly: Ang Classmate Kong Alien (Viva Films, 1989)
Estudyante Blues (Viva Films, 1989)

References

External links

1973 births
Living people
Filipino male television actors
That's Entertainment Friday Group Members
That's Entertainment (Philippine TV series)
Male actors from Manila
Filipino male film actors